The 2013 New York Cosmos season was the first season of the new team playing in the new North American Soccer League. Including the previous franchise, this was the sixteenth season of the club playing professional soccer in the New York metropolitan area.  The Cosmos sat out the league's spring season, joining for the second half of the year.  They won the Fall Championship, and became the 2013 NASL Champions by winning the Soccer Bowl.

Background 

The second version of the New York Cosmos came into existence during the summer of 2010. During the 2011 and 2012 calendar years, several youth teams and one tributary team under the Cosmos name played in an array of matches. The last season an organized team under the name "New York Cosmos" competed in any sort of professional level is 1985, nearly thirty years ago, when the Cosmos operated as an independent soccer club.

Review

June
On June 18, 2013, Cosmos played their first friendly of the season, defeating Newtown Pride FC 6–0.

July
On July 1, former United States men's national soccer team midfielder Danny Szetela agreed to join the Cosmos.

On July 19, Cosmos signed Brazilian centre back Rovérsio.

On July 21, the Cosmos played their second friendly of the season against Old Carthusians in London, England. The final score was 4–1 to Cosmos.

Three days later on July 24, Cosmos played their second friendly in England against Leyton Orient, losing 2–1.

The Cosmos then played their third and final friendly in England against Gillingham, drawing 1–1.

Club

Roster

Team management

Goal scorers

Disciplinary record

Transfers

In

Out

Loan in

Loan out

References 

New York Cosmos (2010–) seasons
New York Cosmos
New York Cosmos
Cosmos